The Association of World Election Bodies, commonly referred to as ‘A-WEB’, was established on October 14, 2013 in Song-do, South Korea. A-WEB is the first global organization of election management bodies, and the membership currently consists of 118 EMBs as members and 20 Regional associations as associate members. Under the slogan of ‘Democracy to Grow for All Worldwide,’ the A-WEB Secretariat provides training programs for election officials of member nations and undertakes country programs at the request of member organization, providing support during the election cycle to boost election management capacity. The current chairman is Sushil Chandra from Republic of India.

Creation and inauguration
The National Election Commission of the Republic of Korea first proposed the creation of a global election management body institution to the Association of Asian Election Authorities (AAEA) in 2010. After a series of Working Group meetings, a Charter was drawn up and the name A-WEB was chosen upon the suggestion of the Election Commission of India.

A-WEB was inaugurated on October 14, 2013. Over 400 participants from 140 election management bodies, international organizations and non-governmental organizations attended the ceremony in Song-do, South Korea, where the Secretariat was established. 97 organizations gained membership into A-WEB.

Structure
A-WEB has three main bodies. The Executive Board serves the executive function and meets yearly to make decisions on A-WEB's general direction. It consists of up to ten member organizations and the Board must maintain a continental balance. The more members there are from a particular continent, the more members of the Executive Board should be from that continent. The Executive Board is headed by a Chairperson who leads the meetings of the board.

The remaining members make up the second body, the General Assembly. The General Assembly convenes once every two years and votes on important issues related to A-WEB and decisions made by the Executive Board. The General Assembly also elects the members of the Executive Board and confirms the induction of new member organizations.

Finally, the secretariat carries out the general administrative work of A-WEB and is based in the country where the Secretary General (elected by the Executive Board) resides. Currently the secretariat is based in Song-do, South Korea. Other member countries send secondee staff to operate the office.

A-WEB Programs

Election Management Capacity Building Program

A-WEB organizes the Election Management Capacity Building Program for election officials to strengthen the election management capacity and manage their elections more effectively and professionally in the future. More specifically, the Election Management Capacity Building Program aims:

 to support the participants to study various electoral systems, discuss issues and challenges each EMB is facing and come up with solutions to the shared problems;
 to provide an opportunity to exchange good practices and learn an international standard of election management;
 to establish a network of election officials around the world and encourage them to share their experiences and expertise.

Diverse professional electoral stakeholders are invited as a guest lecturers to help participants have a better understanding of all aspects of election management and electoral cycle. The program also enables the participants to learn not only from the lecturer(s), but also from amongst the participants themselves through interactive discussions.

Each program addresses a particular topic on the electoral process such as political participation of marginalized groups, gender equality, and media in election management, giving the participants a chance to consider overlooked elements that may affect the fairness of their election management.

Country Programs

Country Programs aim to strengthen the accuracy in election processes by improving systems related to election management and support the establishment of ‘good governance’ based on the needs and demands of EMBs.

Election Visitor Program

A-WEB Election Visitor Program aims to increase understanding of different election systems and to share and spread better practices and the use of ICT in elections through observing election administration of member EMBs, as the article 4.1. of A-WEB charter; Encourage the development and promotion of a democratic culture and an environment conducive to the holding of free, fair, transparent and participative elections.

Current members
 The Central Commission of the Republic of Belarus on Elections and Holding Republican Referenda
 Commission Electorale Nationale Autonome of Benin
 Election Commission of Bhutan
Bolivian Electoral Supreme Court
 BiH Central Election Commission
 Central Election Commission of Bulgaria
 Commission Electorale Nationale Independante of Burkina Faso
 National Independent Electoral Commission of Burundi
 Elections Cameroon
 Elections Canada
 Registraduria Nacionial del Estado Civil of Colombia
 Supreme Electoral Court of Costa Rica
 Commission Electorale Independante of Côte d'Ivoire
 State Election Commission of the Republic of Croatia
 Election Department / Ministry of Interior of Djibouti
 Electoral Commission of Dominica
 Junta Central Electoral of the Dominican Republic
 Tribunal Superior Electoral of the Dominican Republic
 Commission Electorale Nationale Independante of the Democratic Republic of Congo
 National Electoral Council of Ecuador
 Higher Elections Commission of Egypt
 Supreme Electoral Tribunal of El Salvador
 National Electoral Board of Ethiopia
 Conseil Constitutionnel of France
 General Elections Commission of Gabon
 Central Election Commission of Georgia
 Electoral Commission of Ghana
 Tribunal Supremo Electoral of Guatemala
 Independent National Electoral Commission of Guinea
 Association of Caribbean Electoral Organizations (Guyana)
Haiti Permanent Electoral Council
 Election Commission of India
 General Elections Commission of the Republic of Indonesia
 Independent High Electoral Commission of Iraq
 Electoral Commission of Jamaica
 Central Election Commission of the Republic of Kazakhstan
 Independent Electoral and Boundaries Commission of Kenya
 National Election Commission of the Republic of Korea
 Central Election Commission of Kosovo
 Central Election Commission of Kyrgyz Republic
 The Central Election Commission of Latvia
 Ministry of Interior & Municipalities of Lebanon
 The Libyan High National Elections Commission
 Independent National Electoral Commission for The Transition of Madagascar
Malawi Electoral Commission
 Elections Commission of Maldives
 National Independent Election Commission of Mali
 Territorial Administration of Republic Mali
 Instituto Nacional Electoral of Mexico
 Central Electoral Commission of Moldova
 General Election Commission of Mongolia
 Comissao Nacional de Eleicoes of Mozambique
 Union Election Commission of Myanmar
 Independent National Electoral Commission of Nigeria
 Election Commission of Pakistan
 Central Elections Commission of Palestine
 Tribunal Electoral de Panama
Philippine Commission on Elections
 National Electoral Commission of Poland
 National Electoral Commission (Comissão Nacional de Eleicões) of Portugal
Puerto Rico State Elections Commission
 Permanent Electoral Authority of Romania
 Central Election Commission of Russia
 National Electoral Commission of Rwanda
St Lucia Electoral commission
 Office of the Electoral Commissioner of Samoa
 National Electoral Commission of São Tomé and Príncipe
 Commission Electorale Nationale Autonome of Senegal
 The Republic Electoral Commission of Serbia
 National Electoral Commission Sierra Leone
 State Election Commission of Republic of Slovenia Secretariat
 Electoral Commission of South Africa
 National Election Commission of South Sudan
 Department of Elections, Sri Lanka
 Independent Electoral Council of Suriname
 Central Election Commission of Republic of China (Taiwan)
 Zanzibar Electoral Commission (Tanzania)
 National Electoral Commission of Tanzania
 Election Commission of Thailand
Timor-Leste's National Electoral Commission
 Commission Electorale Nationale Independante of Togo
Tonga Electoral Commission
 Elections & Boundaries Commission of Trinidad and Tobago
 Supreme Election Council of Turkey
 Electoral Commission of Uganda
 Central Election Commission of Uzbekistan
 Electoral Office of Republic of Vanuatu
 Consejo National Electoral of Venezuela
 Supreme Commission for Elections and Referendum of Yemen
 Electoral Commission of Zambia

References

Election and voting-related organizations
International organizations based in South Korea
Organizations established in 2013
2013 establishments in South Korea